Good Girls Revolt is an American period drama streaming television series. It is inspired by Lynn Povich's 2013 book The Good Girls Revolt and based on real-life events. The show was released on October 28, 2016, on Amazon Prime Video.

On December 2, 2016, Amazon cancelled the series after one season.

Plot
The series follows a group of young female writers at the fictitious News of the Week magazine (representing the real Newsweek of the non-fiction book The Good Girls Revolt) in the revolutionary times of the women's movement.

Women in the newsroom ("The Pit") are relegated to low-level positions (the researchers). Many researchers are more talented and better educated than their male colleagues (the reporters), and do original writing ("files") that the reporters later incorporate more-or-less directly into their stories, often without adaptation ("rewrite"), and always without attribution ("byline"), yet they are paid considerably less.

These women have a sense that they're paid a lot less, and during the series it emerges just how much lower their pay is (about one-third of their colleague reporter's salary). But also at issue is the fact that their writing is not recognized: on a rare occasion when a female researcher's writing is openly accepted (such as when a male reporter quits just before a deadline), the researcher's story is nonetheless published, but under the departed reporter's name   only.

Cast

Main
 Genevieve Angelson as Patricia "Patti" Robinson
 Anna Camp as Jane Hollander
 Erin Darke as Cindy Reston
 Hunter Parrish as Douglas "Doug" Rhodes
 Chris Diamantopoulos as Evan Phinnaeus "Finn" Woodhouse
 Joy Bryant as Eleanor Holmes Norton

Recurring
 Jim Belushi as William "Wick" McFadden
 Grace Gummer as Nora Ephron
 Frankie Shaw as Naomi
 Leah Moth as Vivian
 Daniel Eric Gold as Sam Rosenberg
 Teddy Bergman as Gabriel "Gabe" Greenstone
 J. P. Manoux as JP Crowley
 Michael Graziadei as Gregory
 Alexander DiPersia as Noah Benowitz
 Cheyenne Haynes as Novo

Episodes

Reception
Good Girls Revolt has received generally positive reviews from critics, with most comparing it to Mad Men and some calling it a female version of that show. On Rotten Tomatoes, a score of 71% was reported with its critical consensus saying: "Good Girls Revolt features a compelling true story, told by a talented cast, even if the period drama hasn't yet achieved Mad Men-level mastery". On Metacritic, it has a 66 out of 100 score indicating, "generally favorable reviews".

References

External links
 
 
 LynnPovich.com

2010s American drama television series
2015 American television series debuts
2016 American television series endings
Amazon Prime Video original programming
English-language television shows
Serial drama television series
Television shows based on non-fiction books
Television series based on actual events
Television series by Amazon Studios
Television series by Sony Pictures Television
Television series set in the 1960s
Television series set in 1969
Television shows filmed in Los Angeles
Works about magazine publishing